Veyrières may refer to the following places in France:

Veyrières, Cantal, a commune in the department of Cantal
Veyrières, Corrèze, a commune in the department of Corrèze

See also
 Verrières (disambiguation)

oc:Veyrières (Cantal)